Ogle County is a county in the northern part of the U.S. state of Illinois. According to the 2010 United States Census, it had a population of 53,497. Its county seat is Oregon, and its largest city is Rochelle. Ogle County comprises Rochelle, IL Micropolitan Statistical Area, which is also included in the Rockford-Freeport-Rochelle, IL Combined Statistical Area.

History
Ogle County was formed in 1836 out of Jo Daviess and LaSalle counties, and named in honor of Captain Joseph Ogle, a veteran of the Revolutionary War who settled in Illinois in 1785. Ogle County government was organized in 1837; before that time it remained assigned to Jo Daviess County for legislative, taxation, and judicial matters. In 1839, part of Ogle County was partitioned off to form Lee County.

Ogle County was a New England settlement. The founders of Oregon and Rochelle arrived from New England; they were "Yankees", descendants of English Puritans who had settled New England in the 1600s. They were part of a wave of farmers who migrated into the Northwest Territory in the early 1800s, their trek eased by completion of the Erie Canal in 1825. They found virgin forest and wild prairie, and quickly laid out farms, constructed roads, erected government buildings and established post routes. They brought a passion for education and strong abolitionism. They were members of the Congregationalist or Episcopalian Church. Culturally Ogle County, like much of northern Illinois would maintain values similar to those of New England.

Geography

Adjacent counties
 Winnebago County - north
 Boone County - northeast
 Stephenson County - northwest
 DeKalb County - east
 Carroll County - west
 Lee County - south
 Whiteside County - southwest
 Lake County, Illinois- northeast

Climate

Demographics

As of the 2010 United States Census, there were 53,497 people, 20,856 households, and 14,711 families residing in the county. The racial makeup of the county was 93.2% white, 0.9% black or African American, 0.5% Asian, 0.2% American Indian, 3.8% from other races, and 1.4% from two or more races. Those of Hispanic or Latino origin made up 8.9% of the population. In terms of ancestry, 38.0% were German, 15.3% were Irish, 10.2% were English, 6.4% were American, 5.3% were Swedish, and 5.3% were Norwegian.

Of the 20,856 households, 33.1% had children under the age of 18 living with them, 56.1% were married couples living together, 9.7% had a female householder with no husband present, 29.5% were non-families, and 24.5% of all households were made up of individuals. The average household size was 2.54 and the average family size was 3.01. The median age was 40.7 years.

The median income for a household in the county was $55,733 and the median income for a family was $64,927. Males had a median income of $49,996 versus $32,082 for females. The per capita income for the county was $24,959. About 6.6% of families and 8.9% of the population were below the poverty line, including 12.4% of those under age 18 and 5.9% of those age 65 or over.

Economy
By 2000, 65% of the county labor force was employed as white-collar workers with an increase of 20 points in comparison with 1990 statistics. Manufacturing remains the leading employment sector absorbing more than 21.7% of the labor force though there was a decrease from 30,4% in 1995. However it is expected that services would replace manufacturing starting 2015 as the leading activity.

Agriculture remains important in Ogle county, mainly corn and soybeans. In 2003, the Illinois Department of Agriculture ranked Ogle County 17th in the State for crop cash receipts, and 14th in the state for livestock cash receipts. As for livestock production, hogs and pigs are still leading even though productions decreased from 57,000 units in 1998 to 48,900 in 2002.

The county also got some investment packages such as a $180 million truck-to-train cargo hub in 2006. In August 2006, it was announced that a new ethanol production facility would receive a package of $5.5 million Opportunity Returns grant from the State.

Politics

Along with its neighbor Lee County, Ogle County is one of the most consistently Republican counties in the nation when it comes to presidential elections. Except for the 1912 election when the GOP was divided between Progressive nominee Theodore Roosevelt and incumbent president William Howard Taft, Ogle County has voted Republican in every Presidential election since the Republican Party first participated in 1856. No Democratic candidate has ever won the county, which favored the Whig Party before the Republican Party was formed.

Historically, Republicans have easily carried the county in statewide and national Democratic landslides. Franklin D. Roosevelt never garnered more than 39 percent of the county's vote in either of his four runs for president, and Barry Goldwater won over 60 percent here in 1964–almost identical to Lyndon Johnson's winning margin statewide. Illinois' own Barack Obama is the only Democrat to ever win at least 40 percent of the county's vote.

The county is part of Illinois's 16th congressional district. represented by Republican Adam Kinzinger.

Transportation

Transit
 List of intercity bus stops in Illinois

Major highways

  Interstate 39
  Interstate 88
  U.S. Highway 51
  U.S. Highway 52
  Illinois Route 2
  Illinois Route 26
  Illinois Route 38
  Illinois Route 64
  Illinois Route 72
  Illinois Route 110
  Illinois Route 251

Airports
The following public-use airports are located in the county:
 Ogle County Airport (C55) - Mount Morris, Illinois
 Rochelle Municipal Airport (RPJ) - Rochelle, Illinois

Recreation

Parks

 Castle Rock State Park
 Lowden State Park
 Lowden-Miller State Forest
 Sinnissippi Farms
 Weld Park
 White Pines State Park

Nature Preserves
 Beach Cemetery Prairie Nature Preserve
 Douglas E. Wade Prairie Nature Preserve
 Jarrett Prairie Nature Preserve
 Nachusa Grasslands

Communities

Cities
 Byron
 Oregon
 Polo
 Rochelle

Villages

 Adeline
 Creston
 Davis Junction
 Forreston
 Hillcrest
 Leaf River
 Monroe Center
 Mount Morris
 Stillman Valley

Unincorporated communities

 Baileyville
 Brookville
 Buffalo Grove
 Chana
 Daysville
 Egan
 Flagg
 Flagg Center
 Hazelhurst (partial)
 Holcomb
 Kings
 Lindenwood
 Paynes Point
 Stratford
 Woosung

Census-designated places
 Grand Detour
 Lost Nation

Townships

 Brookville Township
 Buffalo Township
 Byron Township
 Dement Township
 Eagle Point Township
 Flagg Township
 Forreston Township
 Grand Detour Township
 Lafayette Township
 Leaf River Township
 Lincoln Township
 Lynnville Township
 Marion Township
 Maryland Township
 Monroe Township
 Mount Morris Township
 Oregon-Nashua Township
 Pine Creek Township
 Pine Rock Township
 Rockvale Township
 Scott Township
 Taylor Township
 White Rock Township
 Woosung Township

See also
 List of settlements in Ogle County, Illinois
 List of townships in Ogle County, Illinois
 List of cemeteries in Ogle County, Illinois
 National Register of Historic Places listings in Ogle County, Illinois

Bibliography

References

External links
 Official website
 Ogle County History
 Ogle County History

 
1836 establishments in Illinois
Illinois counties
Populated places established in 1836